Tanga is one of eleven administrative districts of Tanga Region in Tanzania. Tanga district is bordered to the north by Mkinga District, to the east by the Indian Ocean, to the south and west by Muheza District. The district seat (capital) is the city of Tanga. The district is the administrative and economic center of Tanga Region.
According to the 2012 census, the district has a total population of 273,332.

Administrative subdivisions
As of 2012, Tanga District was administratively divided into 24 wards.

Wards

Education & Health 
As of February 2017, there were 124 Schools in Tanga district, 98 of are primary schools and 26 are secondary schools. 
In Terms of Healthcare facilities, as of 2021 Tanga district is home to 27 health centers.

References

Districts of Tanga Region